Maria Mikhailovna of Chernigov (1212-1271), was a Princess of Rostov by marriage to Prince Vasilko Konstantinovich of Rostov, and regent of Rostov during the minority of her son Prince Boris Vasilkovich of Rostov.

She was the daughter of Prince Saint Michael of Chernigov. In 1238, her spouse died in the Battle of the River Sit against Batu Khan during the Mongol invasion.  She became regent and guardian of her son Boris during his minority. She is described as well educated and a wise regent.  

She is foremost known for her chronicle, which is a valuable source about 13th-century Rostov.

References

1271 deaths
13th-century Rus' women
Kievan Rus' princesses
13th-century women rulers
Orthodox Christian Chroniclers
13th-century women writers
1212 births